Peter Mamakos (December 14, 1918 – April 27, 2008) was an American film and television actor.

Early life 
Mamakos was of Greek descent. Mamakos' father owned Pilgrim restaurants in New England. Mamakos was sent to California to scout locations for restaurants, but he liked Hollywood so much that he decided to stay, declining his father's offers of $50,000 in cash and a $250,000 nightclub of his own if he returned to Boston. He told a reporter, "I feel right at home in Hollywood. A hot kitchen and a hot sound stage are alike -- you're surrounded by hams in both."

Career 
Peter Mamakos was perhaps best known for playing Greek, Indian, Hispanic, French, Italian and Middle Eastern villains from the 1940s through the 1990s.

Film 
Mamakos was in eight movies in his first seven months in Hollywood. Mamakos appeared in Trail of the Yukon (1949), in which he and other supporting players offered what a Variety review called "stock performances".

Television 
He had a recurring role as Jean Lafitte on the ABC western The Adventures of Jim Bowie. He also appeared as a Lionian Henchman in Tarzan and the Slave Girl (1950) starring Lex Barker. Mamakos made three guest appearances on Perry Mason from 1962 to 1966, including the role of murderer Nick Paolo in the 1962 episode, "The Case of the Stand-in Sister", Juan Carlos Ramirez in the 1964 episode, "The Case of a Place Called Midnight" and murder victim Olaf Deering in the 1966 episode, "The Case of the Sausalito Sunrise". He also appeared in 1966 in episodes 41 and 42 of Batman. He appeared in several episodes of the TV show The Lone Ranger.

Mamakos is also remembered as Happy J. King, the Metropolis crime boss who engaged a European criminal scientist to invent "synthetic kryptonite". Kidnapping Lois Lane and Jimmy Olsen, King came closer than any other criminal in ridding the Earth of Superman (George Reeves). This event was recounted in "The Defeat of Superman", the sixth episode of the second season of The Adventures of Superman which first aired on October 24, 1953. He co-starred on Daniel Boone in 1970 as a Cherokee chief in episode 18 "A Run for the Money".

Personal life 
Mamakos was married and had a daughter who was born in 1955 and a son born in 1957.

Filmography

References

External links 

1918 births
2008 deaths
American people of Greek descent
American male film actors
American male television actors
20th-century American male actors